"F U Kristmas!" is a Christmas single by British singer Kim Wilde and thrash metal band Lawnmower Deth. The single was released in the United Kingdom as a digital download on iTunes and Google Play Music and on CD on 18 December 2017.

There are two versions of the main track, both R-rated: "F U Kristmas! (Clean Mix)" and "Fuck You Kristmas! (Sweary Mix)", the lyrics of the latter containing more explicit language. Both versions were made available on streaming sites Apple Music and Deezer on 1 December 2017.

Background
The song was written by Pete Lee, Paddy O'Maley, Steve Nesfield and Kim and Ricky Wilde and recorded by Kim Wilde and Lawnmower Deth in 2017. It has been described as an "anti-Christmas song" and a "punk and thrash-metal crossover number with thrashing riffs and hardcore vocals."

Wilde described working with the band as a "collaboration bound to happen" since joining them on stage at Download Festival in 2016, adding it was "a personal highlight of [her] career." She has previously stated that Lawnmower Deth’s cover of her debut single "Kids in America" is her favourite version of the track and credited the band with the idea of them collaborating on a Christmas song. Pete Lee, vocalist for Lawnmower Deth, said the collaboration was "the greatest project [the band has] been involved in."

Music video
A music video accompanying the release of "F U Kristmas!" was released onto Kim Wilde's Vevo YouTube channel on 1 December 2017 at a total length of three minutes and one second.

Track listing

References

2017 singles
Kim Wilde songs
Songs written by Kim Wilde
Songs written by Ricky Wilde
2017 songs
British Christmas songs